TWH or twh could refer to:

 Tai Dón language, a language of Vietnam, Laos, and China
 Tai Wo Hau station, Hong Kong; MTR station code
 Tennessee Walking Horse, a breed of horse
 Toronto Western Hospital, a hospital in Toronto, Canada
 Tung Wah Hospital, a hospital in Sheung Wan, Hong Kong
 Terawatt-hour (TWh), a measure of electrical energy, 1012 watt-hours
 The White House, the official residence and principal workplace of the president of the United States
TWH Collectibles, a diecast scale model vehicle manufacturer.